Knattspyrnufélagið Víkingur, commonly referred to as Víkingur or Víkingur Reykjavík (to distinguish them from Víkingur Ólafsvík) and internationally known as Vikingur F.C., is an Icelandic sports club based in the Fossvogur neighbourhood of Reykjavík. It is one of the oldest sports clubs in Iceland, founded on 21 April 1908.

The football club has won six Championship titles, five First Division titles and four Cup titles. Víkingur operates other sports divisions including handball, tennis, table tennis, karate and skiing. All sports include both male and female teams.

Crest and colours

Club crest
Þorbjörn Þórðarson, who was the chairman of the Vikingur in the period of 1943–44, designed the original Víkingur badge.  In the foreground of Vikingur's original crest is a brownish 19th century leather ball framed with white badges and has red and black stripes in the background.

Team outfit
The Vikings have played in red and black striped outfits since the club's early years.

Home ground

Víkin
Facilities and home ground are located at Víkin since 1984 when a football pitch was first laid there. The club residence followed in 1988 and indoor facilities were built in 1991, significantly improving the overall facilities. Víkin is located in the district of Fossvogur (Háaleiti & Bústaðir), on the east side of Reykjavík.

Víkingsvöllur
The sports venue was constructed in 2004 and completed in 2005. Víkingsvöllur holds around 2000 spectators.

Youth training
The youth training program at Víkin is notable for its contribution to the Iceland national senior and youth teams, providing in recent years players such as: Kári Árnason, Sölvi Ottesen, Kolbeinn Sigþórsson, Aron Elís Þrándarson, Óttar Magnús Karlsson

Club history

The Founding Fathers of Víkingur (1908)
Víkingur Reykjavik was founded on the 21 April 1908 with the purpose of financing a ball purchase for a group of boys in a Reykjavik neighborhood to play football. The club's inaugural meeting, with 32 boys present, was held in the basement of Túngata 12 in Reykjavik.

The founding fathers of Víkingur Reykjavik Football Club were:
Axel Andrésson (12 years old) who initially chaired the board of directors.
Emil Thoroddsen (9 years old) who served as a secretary.
Davíð Jóhannesson (11 years old) who took on the role of treasurer.
Páll Andrésson and Þórður Albertsson.

The Unbeaten Decade (1908–1918)
In the first 10 years of Vikingur's history, the team failed to win in only a single match. In that period Vikingur scored 58 goals and conceded 16. However, the team did not win a single title in that time due to them not yet having a regular senior side to play in the Icelandic Championship.

First Championship Titles (1918–1947)
The Viking's first match in the Championship took place on 9 June 1918 – when the team ensured a 5–0 victory over their rivals Valur. Two years later the club won its first Championship title. The second Championship title came in 1924.
During the first 40 years of Vikingur's history, the club did not to have any actual club facilities.

Residence at Suðurgata (1947–1950)

Vikingur's first residence was a former "Iglo officers club" in Camp Tripoli at Suðurgata which the club took on lease in the years between 1946–50 by promises of being slotted an area of land south of University of Iceland at Vatnsmýri.  The residence at Camp Tripoli proved to be a true lever for the club for a period of time, since in Víkingur's first decades, meetings were held in various places in Reykjavik and the club did not have any sporting facilities. Vikingur was later assigned an area of land in conjunction with Íþróttafélag Reykjavíkur at Vatnsmýri.

Hæðargarður & First Cup Win (1950–1975)
Following the years at Suðurgata, Víkingur continued its search for a suitable club location since the given area at Vatnsmýri was considered too small for the club.

In 1953, building constructions began for a new club house at Hæðargarður in the district of Bústaða- og smáíbúðahverfi Reykjavíkur, which at the time was being organized. However, despite the new club house, the club's working environment was poor as there were no sporting facilities or home pitch. Training continued to take place in various settings in Reykjavik.

Víkingur's first Icelandic Cup title in men's football came in the year 1971, when the team was victorious in the final over rivals UBK Kópavogur, 1–0.

Growth in Fossvogur (since 1976)
It wasn't until the year 1976 that Víkingur got assigned an area of land in Fossvogur and began to build up its residence and sporting facilities. In general, the main service area of the club is demarcated by Fossvogsdalur, Kringlumýrarbraut, Miklabraut and Reykjanesbraut.

Much work was done to prepare the grounds in Fossvogur during the years of 1981,1982 and 1983 when the Vikingur team clinched the first consecutive football Championship- and Super Cup titles in the club's history. A couple of years later, in 1984, footballers could start training at Víkin. Construction of the indoor facilities were completed in 1991, the same year as Víkingur retained its latest Championship title. Construction began in 2004 on the sports venue at Víkin and was inaugurated in 2005. Víkin seats around 1,200 spectators. In the 2015 season, the men's football team will take part in the UEFA Europa League, having reached the club's highest league position of 4th place since winning the Championship in 1991.

League history

Men's football

1918–56: Division 1
1957–69: Division 2
1970: Division 1
1971: Division 2
1972: Division 1
1973: Division 2
1974–85: Division 1
1986–87: Division 2
1988–93: Division 1
1994: Division 2
1995: Division 1
1996–98: Division 2
1999: Division 1
2000–03: Division 2
2004: Division 1
2005: Division 2
2006–07: Division 1
2008–10: Division 2
2011: Division 1
2012–13: Division 2
2014–: Division 1

2013 Season
After a period of struggle and re-organization at Víkin in the 2012 season, the Víkingur team won promotion to the football Championship.

Aron Elís Þrándarson was chosen both as the 'most promising' and 'best' player in the league.

2014 Season
Having regained their place in the football Championship in 2013, the team finished 4th place, achieving the club's highest league position since 1991.

2015 Season
Víkingur men's team played their first Europa League qualifiers since 1992, and admit a 2–3 defeat on aggregate against Slovenian team FC Koper.

Arnþór Ingi Kristinsson scored both of Víkingur's goals in the away clash against FC Koper. Ólafur Þórðarson parted ways with the club.

2016 Season
Only lacking the temporal difference to challenge for a spot in the Europa League qualification the team's fate was a mid-table finish.

Óttar Magnús Karlsson was the standout player in the team as he was chosen 'most promising player' in the league.

2017 Season
The season turned sharply by Miloš Milojević surprise resignation from the gaffers position early in the season.

This event cued the return to home of the then retired multiple championship winner and fans favourite Logi Ólafsson, who steered them to a safe mid-table finish.

2018 Season
Memorable for lively supporters match day experiences at Víkin, the 2018 early season performance was however highly affected by sloppy pitch conditions.

Acclaimed Iceland International Sölvi Geir Ottesen made his return to Víkin - now alternatively known as the 'Homeground of Happiness'.

At the end of the season Logi Ólafsson moved back into retirement passing the managerial position to his assistant and former International Arnar Gunnlaugsson.

2019 Season

Players

Men's Football - Current Squad

Men's Football - Out on loan

Managerial history - Men's Football

20th Century 
 Axel Andrésson (1908–24)
 Guðjón Einarsson (1935-1938)
 Fritz Buchloh (1939–)
 Eggert Jóhannesson (1969)(1971)
 Pétur Bjarnason (1973)
 Billy Haydock (1976-1978)
 Antony Sanders (1974-1975)
 Yuri Illichev (1978–79)
 Yuri Sedov (1980–82)(87–89)
 Jean-Paul Colonval (1983)
 Björn Árnason (1984–85)
 Hafsteinn Tómasson (1985)
 Logi Ólafsson (1990–92)
 Lárus Guðmundsson (1993)
 Kjartan Másson (1994)
 Pétur Pétursson (1995)
 Aðalsteinn Aðalsteinsson (1996)
 Magnús Þorvaldsson (1997)

21st Century 
 Luka Kostić (1998–00)(02)
 Björn Bjartmarz (2001)
 Sigurður Jónsson (2003–05)
 Magnús Gylfason (2006–07)
 Jesper Tollefsen (2007–08)
 Leifur Garðarsson (2009–11)
 Andri Marteinsson (2011)
 Bjarnólfur Lárusson (2011)
 Ólafur Þórðarson (2011–15)
  Miloš Milojević (2015–17)
 Logi Ólafsson (2017–18)
 Arnar Gunnlaugsson (2018–)

Notable former players
Following players have represented Víkingur and either made at least 100 league appearances for the club, or made at least 10 appearances for their national team.

 Helgi Sigurðsson
 Arnór Guðjohnsen
 Kári Árnason
 Sölvi Ottesen
 Kolbeinn Sigþórsson
 Aron Elís Þrándarson
 Óttar Magnús Karlsson
 Richard Keogh
 Kemar Roofe

Player records

Men's football - Most appearances
In the current squad, Halldór Smári is the most capped player for Víkingur with 301 matches followed by Dofri Snorrason with 186.

David Örn Atlason has 142 matches and Sölvi Geir Ottesen has 84 matches to his name. (May 2019)

European record

Men's football - European Clashes

Notes:
 1R: First Round
 1Q: First Qualifying Round
 PR: Preliminary Round

Achievements & club honours

Men's football

League

Icelandic League Championships (6): 1920, 1924, 1981, 1982, 1991, 2021
First Division Championships (5) (tier 2): 1969, 1971, 1973, 1987, 2010

Cup
Icelandic Cup (4): 1971, 2019, 2021, 2022
Icelandic Super Cup (3): 1982, 1983, 2022

Men's handball

League
Icelandic League Championships (7): 1975, 1980, 1981, 1982, 1983, 1986, 1987
First Division Championships(Tier 2) (5): 1961, 1966, 1969, 1997, 1999

Cup
Icelandic Cup Championships(6): 1978, 1979, 1983, 1984, 1985, 1986

Women's handball

League
Icelandic League Championships (3): 1991, 1992, 1993

Cup
Icelandic Cup Championships (2): 1992, 1994

Supporters

Club anthem
In celebration of the club's centennial anniversary in 2008, Vikingur supporters club held a competition for a new club anthem to be played at home games. The winning song, Vikingur – 100 years, or simply: Við viljum sigur í dag Víkingar! was composed and performed by Stefán Magnússon and Freyr Eyjólfsson

Shirt sponsors

Staff & board 2019

Men's football
Manager: Arnar Gunnlaugsson
Assistant/Strength Coach: Guðjón Örn Ingólfsson
Assistant/GK Coach: Hajrudin Čardaklija
Coach: Einar Guðnason
Physio: Ísak Guðmann
Squad Manager: Fannar Helgi Rúnarsson
Squad Manager: Þórir Ingvarsson
Managing director: Haraldur V. Haraldsson
Sports Director: Fannar Helgi Rúnarsson
Football Pitch Manager: Örn I. Jóhannsson
Chairman: Friðrik Magnusson
Vice chairman: Heimir Gunnlaugsson
Project Manager: Benedikt Sveinsson
Boardmember: Hrannar Már Gunnarsson
Gjaldkeri: Valdimar Sigurðsson
Boardmember: Tryggvi Björnsson
Boardmember: Sverrir Geirdal
Head of youth development: Einar Guðnason

References

External links
Official Website
Vikingur's Supporters Club
Club Newsletter
Official Facebook Page
Football Association of Iceland
Vikingsvöllur stadium
Vikings Football Podcast
Old Football Shirts - Víkingur 
IcelandFootball.net Profile 
Soccerway Profile 
FC Tables - Statistics

 
Multi-sport clubs in Iceland
Vikingur
Association football clubs established in 1908
Football clubs in Reykjavík
1908 establishments in Iceland
Sport in Reykjavík